A Hundred Hardanger Tunes (Op. 151) is a collection of folk songs from the Hardanger region of Norway arranged for orchestra by the composer Geirr Tveitt between 1954 and 1963. Of the originally planned 100 tunes, 4 suites with a total of 60 songs are extant.

Background
Geirr Tveitt (1908 – 1981) began to collect folk songs from the Hardanger region of Norway in the mid 1930s and continued throughout World War II. Of the more than 1000 tunes he collected, he first arranged 50 for piano as his opus 150. He then undertook the larger project of opus 151, A Hundred Hardanger Tunes for orchestra. Some of the songs are entirely Tveitt's own compositions. The songs are arranged into suites, of which number three (31–45) has been lost and number five (61–75) is the last, giving a total of 60 extant songs.

Suites

Suite nr. 1, 1–15
Adapted from a suite of twelve songs arranged for opus 150 in 1950. Composed in its final form in the autumn of 1954 and first performed in 1954 by the conductor Odd Grüner-Hegge and the Oslo Philharmonic.

Suite nr. 2 Fjellstev nr. 16–30
Composed in 1955 and first performed on 7 June 1955 at the Bergen Festival, by the conductor Odd Grüner-Hegge and the Filharmonisk Selskap.

Suite nr. 3, 31–45 (lost)
Never performed. According to Tveitt, the songs were about farming and old customs. The scores were lost when Tveitt's home burned down in 1970.

Suite nr. 4 Brudlaupssuiten nr. 46-60
Composed in 1958 and first performed the same year in Bergen by Odd Grüner-Hegge and the Filharmonisk Selskap.

Suite nr. 5 Trolltonar  nr. 61–75
First performed in 1963 in Bergen by the conductor Arvid Fladmoe and Harmonien.

Tveitt made sketches for more suites, but they were lost in the fire in 1970.

Discography
Simax Classics released a recording of suite one in 1989, performed by Per Dreier and the Royal Philharmonic Orchestra. BIS Records released suites one and two on CD in December 1998, titled 100 Folk-tunes from Hardanger and performed by the conductor Ole Kristian Ruud and the Stavanger Symphony Orchestra. In July 2001 and January 2002, Naxos released two CDs with performances by the conductor Bjarte Engeset and the Royal Scottish National Orchestra, under the title A Hundred Hardanger Tunes. The first CD features suites one and four, and the second features suites two and five.

References

Compositions by Geirr Tveitt
Norwegian folk music
Compositions for symphony orchestra
1954 compositions
1955 compositions
1958 compositions
1963 compositions